Émile Henri Roblot (15 February 1886 – 24 August 1963) was an ex-minister of state for Monaco. He was in office from August 1937 to September 1944.

References

Ministers of State of Monaco
1963 deaths
1886 births